The Peravia least gecko (Sphaerodactylus ocoae) is a species of lizard in the family Sphaerodactylidae. The species is endemic to the Dominican Republic.

Etymology
The specific name, ocoae, refers to the Sierra de Ocoa mountain range.

Geographic range
S. ocoae is found in Peravia Province, Dominican Republic.

Habitat
The preferred habitat of S. ocoae is forest.

Reproduction
S. ocoae is oviparous.

References

Further reading
Rösler H (2000). "Kommentierte Liste der rezent, subrezent und fossil bekannte Geckotaxa (Reptilia: Gekkonomorpha) ". Gekkota 2: 28–153. (in German).
Schwartz A, Henderson RW (1991). Amphibians and Reptiles of the West Indies: Descriptions, Distributions, and Natural History. Gainesville: University of Florida Press. 720 pp. .
Schwartz A, Thomas R (1977). "Two New Species of Sphaerodactylus (Reptilia, Lacertilia, Gekkonidae) from Hispaniola". Journal of Herpetology 11 (1): 61–66. (Sphaerodactylus ocoae, new species, p. 61).

Sphaerodactylus
Reptiles of the Dominican Republic
Endemic fauna of the Dominican Republic
Reptiles described in 1977
Taxa named by Albert Schwartz (zoologist)